Top Model, cycle 3 was the third cycle of Top Model. It originally aired on TV3 from September to November 2008, and was hosted by Vendela Kirsebom.

The competition began with fifteen semi-finalists, who were narrowed down to thirteen finalists in the first episode. In the third episode, Silje entered the competition after Sasha was disqualified for refusing her makeover. The winner of the competition was 17-year-old Martine Lervik from Ålesund.

Contestants
Semi-finalists

Finalists

Summaries

Call-out order

 The contestant was eliminated 
 The contestant was disqualified from the competition
  The contestant was put through collectively to the next round
 The contestant was part of a non-elimination bottom four
 The contestant quit the competition
 The contestant won the competition

In episode 1, the group of fifteen semi-finalists was whittled down to thirteen. 
In episode 3, Sasha was disqualified for refusing her makeover. She was replaced by Silje. 
In episode 4, only Goshia, Helene, Marita and Mona Lisa were in danger of elimination due to their inappropriate behaviour earlier in the week. However, none of them were eliminated.
In episode 12, Frøydis decided to leave the competition for health reasons during the elimination ceremony. As a result, neither of the remaining girls were eliminated.

Photo Shoot Guide
Episode 1 Photoshoot: Sexy in Dirt
Episode 2 Photoshoot: Group shot on stairs
Episode 3 Photoshoot: Murderous Brides
Episode 4 Photoshoot: Homeless Fashion
Episode 5 Photoshoot: Moroccan Fashion
Episode 6 Photoshoot: Dresses in the wind
Episode 7 Photoshoot: Rendezvous with Hank von Helvetes
Episode 8 Photoshoot: Fashion Walk on the Streets
Episode 9 Photoshoot: Underwater Muses
Episode 10 Photoshoot: Fashion Glasses
Episode 11 Photoshoot: Sex and the City Glamour & Cosmopolitan Cover Shoot

Judges
Vendela Kirsebom
Jan Thomas
 Mariana Verkerk - catwalk coach

References

External links
Official site (Norwegian)
Norway's Next Top Model at the Internet Movie Database

Top Model Norge
2000s Norwegian television series
2008 Norwegian television series debuts
2008 Norwegian television seasons